Joe Habets is a former association football player who represented New Zealand at international level.

Habets made a solitary official international appearance for New Zealand in a 0–4 loss to New Caledonia on 8 November 1967.

References 

Year of birth missing (living people)
Living people
New Zealand association footballers
New Zealand international footballers
Association footballers not categorized by position